Fremont Motors is a privately owned new and used automotive retailer in the United States. It was founded in April, 1938 in Lander, Wyoming. The company owns and operates 14 dealerships in Wyoming and Nebraska. The current president of Fremont Motor Companies is Cathy Guschewsky, and the CEO is her daughter Arin Emmert.

History
The original Fremont Motor Company dealership started in 1938 in Lander, Wyoming, selling Ford Model Ts, deluxe sedans, and trucks. In 1938, Arin Emmert's great grandfather started Fremont Motors in Lander, Wyoming. Her father, Chuck (Chuck) Guschewsky was appointed the president of the company in 1989. As of 2013, Fremont Motors has fourteen dealerships and employs between 400 and 425 full-time "associates".

List of dealerships

Lander
Ford
Ram
Chrysler
Dodge
Jeep
Toyota

Cody
Ford
Ram
Chrysler 
Lincoln
Jeep
Dodge

Sheridan
Ford
Lincoln
Toyota

Powell
Ford
Lincoln
Chrysler
Dodge
Jeep
Ram

Rock Springs
Ram
Chrysler 
Dodge
Jeep
Fiat

Riverton
Ford
Lincoln
Chevrolet
GMC
Buick

Casper
Ram
Chrysler 
Volkswagen
Dodge
Fiat
Jeep

Scottsbluff
Ford
Lincoln

References

External links
 fremontmotors.com

Auto dealerships of the United States
Companies based in Wyoming
Retail companies established in 1938
1938 establishments in Wyoming
Privately held companies based in Wyoming